Valentina Monetta (born 1 March 1975) is a Sammarinese singer. She also announced the Sammarinese points at the Eurovision Song Contest 2015. In the 2014 contest, Monetta became the first Sammarinese entrant to qualify for the final.

Early life
Valentina Monetta was born and raised in San Marino, the younger of the two children of a Sammarinese mother and an Italian father. A graduate of the Giovanni da Rimini school in Rimini, she played piano and sang from an early age. She began her singing career in 1995 fronting the group Tiberio and was subsequently involved with a number of bands including Parafunky, Harem-B, 2blackBluesmobile, and My Funky Valentine. She competed in the 2001 edition of the televised singing competition Popstars. (it).

Career

Eurovision 2008 
In 2008 Monetta sent in the song "Se Non Ci Sei Tu" for the San Marino national selection for the Eurovision Song Contest 2008, but was not selected by San Marino RTV.

Eurovision 2012 
On 14 March 2012, San Marino RTV announced that Monetta would represent San Marino in the Eurovision Song Contest 2012, held in Baku, Azerbaijan, with the entry "Facebook Uh, Oh, Oh". She was internally selected by RTV. However, on 18 March 2012, a few days after the song was announced, the EBU deemed that the song contained an unreasonable commercial message for Facebook, which resulted in the lyrics' disqualification; according to the Eurovision Rule 1.2.2.g, commercial messages within songs are not allowed. San Marino was then given the option of submitting a new song for Monetta, or revising the lyrics to remove any references to Facebook, no later than 23 March 2012 12:00 CET. On 22 March, SMTV announced that the song and its lyrics has been revised with a new title, "The Social Network Song (OH OH – Uh - OH OH)", with mostly the same lyrics, except without directly mentioning Facebook. Monetta performed at the first semi-final but failed to qualify for the grand final. However, she placed 14th in the semi-final with 31 points making it San Marino's best ever placing in Eurovision Song Contest until 2013.

Eurovision 2013 
On 30 January 2013, it was announced by San Marino TV that Monetta would return for a second time in a row representing San Marino in the Eurovision Song Contest 2013 in Malmö with the entry "Crisalide (Vola)", composed by Ralph Siegel with lyrics by Mauro Balestri. She competed in the second semi final on 16 May 2013 and once more failed to qualify for the grand final, despite her performance having been voted second only to Denmark (the eventual winners) by the Organisation of Eurovision Fans, OGAE. Her performance gained 47 points, placing 11th in the semi-final, and was the best of the non-qualifying countries in either of the two semi-finals, and it consequently improved their previous best placing of 14th in 2012.

New album 2013 
In June 2013 Monetta released her new album La storia di Valentina Monetta which included  multiple versions of "Crisalide (Vola)"  and some songs previously available on her 2011 EP.

Eurovision 2014 

Monetta once again represented San Marino in the Eurovision Song Contest 2014. This made Monetta the first singer to represent a nation in three consecutive Eurovision contests since 1966, the year Udo Jürgens of Austria competed in Eurovision for the third consecutive time. Monetta became the fourth singer to compete in three consecutive Eurovision contests as prior to Jürgens both Lys Assia of Switzerland and Corry Brokken of the Netherlands competed in the Eurovision contests of 1956, 1957, and 1958. Assia, Brokken and Jürgens each won one of the three consecutive Eurovision contests in which they competed.

Monetta unveiled her third Eurovision song on 14 March 2014. It was included on her new album, which will include songs composed by Ralph Siegel and by Monetta herself. The first single from her upcoming album, "L'amore verrà", was released along with the music video on 11 October 2013.

During the Eurovision semifinal Monetta made it to the final for the first time in three attempts, achieving her personal best placing in the contest but also securing San Marino's first, and until 2019, only qualifying song. She finished the final in 24th position.

Eurovision 2015 
In a video of the official Eurovision channel on YouTube, Valentina said that she would perhaps represent San Marino for the fourth time in a row, and consequently enter into Eurovision history as the only artist ever to represent their nation four consecutive times. In May 2014, it was confirmed by SMTV that Valentina would not return in 2015.

The singer later confirmed on Instagram that she would never return to the contest for a long while and it was her own decision not to go to Eurovision again.

On 2 February 2015, it was announced that Monetta would announce Sammarinese votes at the 2015 Eurovision Song Contest in Vienna, Austria. This was met with rather a lot of confusion as Monetta herself said that she had not been asked to do it yet, even though most people expected the microstate to choose Monetta to read out the Sammarinese votes in Vienna.

Eurovision 2017
On 12 March 2017, it was confirmed that Monetta would represent San Marino for the fourth time, in the Eurovision Song Contest 2017. Her song, "Spirit of the Night", is sung as a duet with American singer Jimmie Wilson. The song placed last in the second semifinal with only 1 point which came from the German televote.

Monetta has tied the record as the woman with the most participations in the Eurovision Song Contest, tied with Elisabeth Andreassen and Sue Schell of Peter, Sue & Marc.

Discography

Albums

Extended plays

Singles

As lead artist

Promotional singles

References 

Sammarinese women singers
Sammarinese people of Italian descent
Sammarinese pop singers
Eurovision Song Contest entrants for San Marino
Eurovision Song Contest entrants of 2012
Eurovision Song Contest entrants of 2013
Eurovision Song Contest entrants of 2014
Living people
1975 births
Articles containing video clips
Eurovision Song Contest entrants of 2017
21st-century women singers